Brady James Monson Corbet (born August 17, 1988) is an American actor and filmmaker. Corbet is known for playing Mason Freeland in the film Thirteen, Brian Lackey in the film Mysterious Skin, Alan Tracy in the 2004 film Thunderbirds, and Peter in the 2007 film Funny Games.  He has made guest appearances on many television shows. He made his feature film directorial debut with The Childhood of a Leader and won Best Debut film and Best Director award at 72nd Venice International Film Festival.

Corbet played Derek Huxley, the son of Jack Bauer's (Kiefer Sutherland) new girlfriend, in the first six episodes of the fifth season of the television series 24.

Career

2000–2005
Corbet began an acting career at age eleven with a guest role in an April 2000 episode of CBS' The King of Queens, and he followed it up with voice work in the English version of the Japanese anime series NieA under 7. Over the next few years, he was a regular on another anime series, I My Me! Strawberry Eggs (2001), and he guest-starred in a May 2002 episode of the WB sitcom Greetings from Tucson. He also appeared in a May 2003 episode of Fox’s sitcom Oliver Beene.

In 2003, Corbet landed his first film role when he was cast opposite Holly Hunter, Evan Rachel Wood, Nikki Reed, Vanessa Hudgens and Jeremy Sisto in director Catherine Hardwicke's Thirteen.

Following his big-screen debut, Corbet starred as Alan Tracy, the youngest son of a billionaire ex-astronaut (played by Bill Paxton) in Thunderbirds (2004), Jonathan Frakes' live-action movie based on the British TV series of the mid-1960s. Corbet once again shared the screen with Hudgens.

In 2004, California filmmaker Gregg Araki cast him opposite Joseph Gordon-Levitt in the director's eighth film, Mysterious Skin. In the film, based on the 1996 novel of the same name by Scott Heim, Corbet portrayed Brian Lackey, a troubled teen who is plagued by nightmares and believes that he may have been abducted by aliens. The film debuted in that year's Venice Film Festival and had a limited release in 2005.

2006–present
In 2006, Corbet returned to television with a recurring role as Derek Huxley, son of Jack Bauer's new girlfriend (played by Connie Britton) in the fifth season of Fox's Emmy- and Golden Globe–winning show, 24.  Corbet most recently played the role of Watts in the 2011 psychological thriller Martha Marcy May Marlene.

Corbet also has appeared in the indie rock band Bright Eyes' music video "At The Bottom Of Everything" (2005).  In October 2006, he was featured in the Ima Robot video for "Lovers in Captivity," which was produced independently of their Virgin record label and was featured in an Out Magazine article.

In 2013, Corbet signed to direct his first feature film The Childhood of a Leader. It premiered in the Horizons section of the 72nd Venice International Film Festival, where he won Best Director in the festival's Horizons (Orrizonti) section. In 2018, Corbet directed his second feature film Vox Lux starring Natalie Portman and Jude Law.

In September 2020, it was reported that Corbet will direct his second feature film, the immigrant drama The Brutalist, starring Joel Edgerton as architect László Toth and Marion Cotillard as his wife Erzsébet.

Personal life
Since 2012, Corbet has been dating director and actress Mona Fastvold, whom he met on the set of The Sleepwalker. Their daughter was born in 2014.

Filmography

As actor

Film

Television

As filmmaker

Awards and nominations

References

External links

1988 births
Living people
21st-century American male actors
American male film actors
American male television actors
American film directors
American film editors
Film producers from Arizona
Male actors from Scottsdale, Arizona
Screenwriters from Arizona